Oakmont may refer to:

Oakmont, Maryland
Oakmont, California, a neighborhood and golf club in Santa Rosa, California
Oakmont (Greenville, North Carolina), listed on the National Register of Historic Places in Pitt County, North Carolina
Oakmont, Pennsylvania
Oakmont Country Club, host of the 2016 U.S. Open
Oakmont, West Virginia